Mohamed Ibrahim Hassan Selim was a lieutenant general in the Egyptian Armed Forces who served as the first chief of the general staff from 1952 to 1959, minister of Military Production from 1971 to 1972, and the first commander of Military Technical College from 1957 to 1971. He was also the founder of that college.

Biography 
Selim was born in 1916 in Cairo, Egypt. He obtained B.Sc. in electrical engineering from Cairo University in 1938, M.Sc. in electrical engineering from Alexandria University in 1958, and later he obtained his PhD in the same engineering discipline from Alexandria university in 1962.

Selim participated in the 1947–1949 Palestine war and the 1949–1956 Palestinian exodus. He also provided technical support to the Egyptian Army during the Six-Day War, and later conducted technical researches to develop uncertain equipment for the Egyptian Army.

His other staff appointments included; one of the members of the High Science Council, member of National Education Affairs and in addition to serving as a member of Development of Wired and Wireless Communications Council.

Awards and decorations 
Selim was awarded the Order of Merit  first class, and Military Prize for Science 1993 by the government of Egypt.

References 

1916 births
Military personnel from Cairo
Chiefs of the General Staff (Egypt)
Cairo University alumni
Faculty of Engineering, Alexandria University alumni
Recipients of the Order of Merit (Egypt)
Year of death missing